The Knot may refer to:

Films
 The Knot (1921 film), an Italian silent film directed by Gaston Ravel
 The Knot (2006 film), a Chinese film directed by Yin Li
 The Knot (2012 film), a British film starring Noel Clarke

Music 

 The Knot (album), 2009 album from Wye Oak
Fan make for the American heavy metal band Slipknot

Other use
 The Knot (company), former name of XO Group and several of its publications

See also
 Knot (disambiguation)